Doshi is a fairly common surname in India. The roots can be traced back a few hundred years. There were different stories — one is from the History of Oswals basically from Rajasthan original Sonigra Kshatriya Rajput. The Gujjar tribe still resides in the village. As Gujaratis are from the Gujjar tribe and people with the Doshi surname are Gujaratis, this village is assumed to be the origin of the surname. Also Doshi surname people follow Jainism in Gujarat region.

History
According to Oswal Jain Gyati Mahodya (ancient book on the history of Oswals) the Doshi are descended from Thakur Heer Singh Sonigara, ruler of Bhatia (old name of Jaisalmer) in Rajasthan in 160 AD.

A Gujarati story which Narsinh Mehta mentions the Hindu deity Krishna appearing as a doshi vanio. A doshi was somebody who carried a dosh, or a sack of grocery/clothes, to sell as he wandered. This is similar to another translation of doshi as a rough cloth seller. Most Gujaratis believe this is the story behind the last name "Doshi".

A third possibility is a direct translation, taken literally from the Hindu word dosh (meaning, in this case, guilt), defines doshi as someone who has been found guilty of a crime. A historical anecdote uses this definition of the word to explain how people assumed the name. According to Kishor Doshi, former president of the Houston Jain Society, the research he has done on this topic indicates Doshi was a last name given by a 16th-century king in Gujarat to all of his subjects who did not participate in a compulsory census. He pronounced them guilty (in Gujarati, doshi theravya). Not many people believe in this possibility given the fact that the state of Gujarat was never under the rule of one king. Present day Gujarat is the result of a merger of more than 222 princely states.

Notable Doshi people
 Walchand Hirachand Doshi (b. 1882), an Industrialist
 Chaturbhuj Doshi (b. 1894), an Indian film director
 B. V. Doshi (b. 1927), an Indian architect
 Navin Doshi (b. 1936), an Indian philanthropist
 Dilip Doshi (b. 1947), an Indian cricketer
 Saryu Doshi, Art scholar
 Sushil Doshi, an Indian journalist
 Tishani Doshi (b. 1975), an Indian poet
 Nayan Doshi (b. 1978), an English cricketer
 Avni Doshi (b. 1982), an American novelist
 Darshan Doshi, an Indian drummer
 Shiny Doshi, an Indian television actress
 Natasha Doshi (b. 1993), an Indian actress
 Rheeya Doshi, Singaporean tennis player

References

Indian surnames
Hindu surnames
Surnames of Indian origin